Kikosi Maalum cha Kuzuia Magendo Sports Club, or simply KMKM SC is a football club from Zanzibar based in Unguja.

Achievements
Tanzanian Premier League : 1
 1984.

Zanzibar Premier League : 8
 1984, 1986, 2004, 2013, 2014, 2019, 2021, 2022.

Nyerere Cup : 3
 1977, 1982, 1983.

Mapinduzi Cup : 1
 2002.

Performance in CAF competitions
CAF Champions League: 5 appearances
2005 – Preliminary Round
2014 – Preliminary Round
2015 – Preliminary Round
2020 – Preliminary Round
2022 – 

CAF Confederation Cup: 1 appearance
2011 – Preliminary Round

Notes

External links
Team profile – The Biggest Football Archive of the World
Team profile – footballzz.co

Football clubs in Tanzania
Zanzibari football clubs